Aristotelia calastomella is a moth of the family Gelechiidae. It is found in Hungary, Ukraine and Russia, as well as on Cyprus. The habitat consists of meadows with Glycyrrhiza glabra and Limonium gmelini.

References

Moths described in 1873
Aristotelia (moth)
Moths of Europe